WOI-DT (channel 5) is a television station licensed to Ames, Iowa, United States, serving the Des Moines area as an affiliate of ABC. It is owned by Tegna Inc. alongside CW affiliate KCWI-TV (channel 23), also licensed to Ames. Both stations share studios on Westown Parkway in West Des Moines, while WOI-DT's transmitter is located in Alleman, Iowa.

In addition to its own digital signal, WOI-DT is simulcast in high definition on KCWI-TV's fifth digital subchannel, using virtual channel 5.5.

History

Early history 
WOI-TV signed on the air on February 21, 1950. It was Iowa's second television station (following WOC-TV, now KWQC-TV, in Davenport), and the first in the Des Moines area. Originally on channel 4, it moved to channel 5 in 1952 because of interference with WHBF-TV in the Quad Cities. Programming came from ABC, CBS, NBC, and the DuMont network during the station's early years, but it was a primary CBS affiliate. NBC disappeared from the schedule when WHO-TV (channel 13) signed on in 1954, and CBS disappeared when KRNT-TV (channel 8, now KCCI) signed on in 1955 owing to KRNT radio's long affiliation with CBS radio, leaving channel 5 an exclusive ABC affiliate. During the late 1950s, the station was also briefly affiliated with the NTA Film Network.

WOI-TV was originally owned by Iowa State University in Ames along with its noncommercial WOI radio stations (AM 640 and FM 90.1), making it the first commercial television station in the United States to be owned by a major college (today, only two commercial TV stations are owned by public universities: KOMU-TV in Columbia, Missouri and WVUA-CD/WVUA in Tuscaloosa, Alabama). As such, it carried some educational programming from sign-on until the Des Moines Public Schools signed on KDPS-TV (channel 11, now KDIN-TV) in 1959. The startup costs for WOI-TV were paid by the remaining monies from a federal grant awarded to the university for work on the Manhattan Project. WOI's facilities were used by the university to deliver lectures by satellite.

Sale to Citadel Communications 
On June 17, 1992, the Iowa Board of Regents voted to sell WOI-TV to Capital Communications Company, a joint venture between Citadel Communications (unrelated to radio station owner Citadel Broadcasting) and Connecticut's Lynch Corporation-- for $14 million. The Board of Regents immediately faced a lawsuit filed by "Iowans for WOI-TV, Inc." opposing the sale and arguing that the station was a benefit to the university. On March 1, 1994, WOI-TV was finally sold, while the university kept the WOI radio stations. Capital moved WOI-TV's studios to a temporary location in Des Moines later that year. In 1998 WOI-TV moved to its current studios.

WOI-TV was home to America's longest running local children's program, The Magic Window. The show ran continuously from 1951 through 1994. The original host (1951–1953) was Joy (Ringham) Munn. Producer Dick Hartzell (Ford Foundation Experimental Programming Development) had two small children and was concerned about the lack of good programs for children. Hartzell asked Joy to assist him in planning a handicraft section for a new program, and soon cast her as host of The Magic Window. Later, it was hosted by Betty Lou Varnum for the last 40 of those years.

In August 2011, comedian Stephen Colbert produced a series of political television ads through his "Colbert Super PAC" to run in Iowa, encouraging Iowans to vote for Texas governor Rick Perry at the 2011 Ames Straw Poll for Republican candidates in the 2012 Presidential election. The ads called for voters to submit the vote for a write-in candidate by spelling Perry's last name "PArry," "with an 'A' for IowA and America." Thus "Rick PArry," would be a fictional candidate. Both KCCI and WHO approved to run the ads while WOI did not, stating that they considered the ads "confusing to viewers." Colbert responded by calling the station out on national television on the August 11 episode of his Comedy Central show The Colbert Report, claiming that station executives "sit in their ivory corn silos and play puppet master with national politics." On the August 15 episode, Colbert issued an apology to WOI general manager/Citadel president Ray Cole for the rant. He went on to challenge the station, which he sarcastically called "Des Moines' News Leader" throughout the saga, to find out the exact number of write-in votes for "Rick PArry" at the Straw Poll and called on the entire weeknight anchor team and intrepid cub reporter Katie Eastman to do so. GOP officials have not released that information and do not intend to. According to filings with the Federal Elections Commission, WOI-DT later donated $1170 to the Colbert Super PAC.

Sale to Nexstar Media Group 

On September 16, 2013, Citadel announced that it would sell WOI-DT, along with KCAU-TV in Sioux City and WHBF-TV in Rock Island, Illinois to the Nexstar Broadcasting Group for $88 million. Nexstar immediately took over the station's operations through a time brokerage agreement. The deal followed Citadel founder and CEO Phil Lombardo's decision to "slow down," as well as a desire by Lynch Entertainment to divest its investments in WOI and WHBF. The sale was completed on March 13, 2014. The deal reunited WOI with two of its former Citadel sister stations, WIVT in Binghamton, New York and WVNY in Burlington, Vermont. WOI-DT thus became the first Nexstar-owned station, the only one before its subsequent acquisition of Tribune Media, and one of a handful in the United States, to utilize a historic three-letter call sign. Nexstar then announced on November 4, 2014, that it would also buy CW affiliate KCWI from Pappas Telecasting for $3.5 million. The sale was finalized on March 14, 2016, with Nexstar announcing shortly after that KCWI would leave its downtown Des Moines studios and consolidate operations with WOI on Westown Parkway.

On January 5, 2015, WOI re-launched as the Graham Media Group "Local" Mandate-inspired Local 5. The change came as part of investments into the station by Nexstar, which saw upgrades to the station's studio equipment and the introduction of a new news studio featuring a touchscreen display. The station also re-launched its morning news as Good Morning Iowa, and will place a larger emphasis on political coverage and how stories "matter" to viewers as part of its overall coverage. A week later, the station took their second subchannel, which carried the moribund Live Well Network, dark, with no replacement programming until August 2016, when Laff launched in the slot.

Sale to Tegna Inc. 
On December 3, 2018, Nexstar announced it would acquire the assets of Chicago-based Tribune Media—which has owned NBC affiliate WHO-DT (channel 13) since December 2013—for $6.4 billion in cash and debt. FCC regulations prohibit common ownership of more than two stations in the same media market, or two or more of the four highest-rated stations in the market. (Furthermore, any attempt by Nexstar to retain operational control of either WOI-DT or WHO-DT through local marketing or shared services agreements would have been subject to regulatory hurdles that would have delayed the FCC and Justice Department's review and approval process for the acquisition.) As such, Nexstar was required to sell WHO-DT or WOI-DT to a separate, unrelated company to address the ownership conflict. (As KCWI does not rank among the top four in total-day viewership and therefore is not in conflict with existing FCC in-market ownership rules, Nexstar would have been able to retain KCWI regardless of whether it retained WOI, or sold WOI in order to acquire WHO.)

Ultimately, on March 20, 2019, Nexstar announced that it would keep the higher-rated WHO-DT and sell WOI and KCWI to McLean, Virginia-based Tegna Inc. once its acquisition of Tribune was consummated. This was part of a deal to sell nineteen Nexstar- and Tribune-operated stations to Tegna and the E. W. Scripps Company in separate deals worth $1.32 billion; the WOI/KCWI duopoly, along with Moline, Illinois sister station WQAD-TV (which Nexstar, on behalf of Tribune, also plans to divest to Tegna as part of the spin-offs), would mark Tegna's first television properties in Iowa. The sale was completed on September 19, 2019. On February 20, 2020, David Loving was named the new general manager; he assumed his duties on March 2, 2020.

Programming
In addition to ABC programming, WOI-DT airs syndicated programs such as Entertainment Tonight and Dr. Phil. The station also airs Iowa State University football and men's basketball games. Until September 27, 2011, WOI-DT did not carry ABC World News Now, instead joining its fellow Citadel stations in signing off each night, one of the few remaining stations in the country to do so.

In November 2004, all three Citadel ABC-affiliated stations, including WOI, had preempted their Veterans' Day showing of the movie Saving Private Ryan.

On December 1, 2008, WOI-TV launched an affiliation with Retro Television Network on its DT2 subchannel, which was later replaced by the Live Well Network on January 16, 2012. It ended at 5 a.m. on January 17, 2015, with Live Well's upcoming end, and like sister stations WHBF and KCAU, which also pulled their DT2 subchannels, WOI took the channel dark with no replacement programming. On August 24, 2016, WOI-TV began broadcasting Laff on its DT2 subchannel.

News operation

Despite its status as Des Moines' oldest TV station, WOI channel 5 has spent the better part of the last half-century as a distant third in the market, in part because ABC wasn't on par with CBS or NBC until the 1970s. When long-dominant KCCI saw its ratings slip in the mid-2000s, WOI-TV reaped little benefit In the May 2011 ratings period, WOI-DT failed to achieve even a 1.0 rating among 18- to 49-year-olds while its share rating remained a 3 or lower. Its morning newscasts barely registered a blip in the ratings. It has consistently been one of ABC's weakest affiliates in the top-100 markets.

On September 11, 2006, WOI dropped the Eyewitness News brand (which the station had used for five years) and rebranded itself as "ABC5", using a variation of the circle 7 logo shared by Citadel's other major network affiliates. Since 2007, the ABC5 Weather team, led by Chief Meteorologist Brad Edwards, has been certified by WeatheRate, an independent weather rating service, as providing, "Central Iowa's Most Accurate Forecast".  Edwards was previously an on-air meteorologist for the Weather Channel.

On October 8, 2010, WOI-DT became the second commercial station in Des Moines (behind WHO-DT) to launch local news into high definition.

Notable former on-air staff
 Brynn Carman – weekend anchor and reporter; now with KRDO-TV in Colorado Springs
 Chris Flanagan – anchor and reporter (2004–2009); now with WFXT in Boston
 Rick Mitchell – meteorologist (now with KXAS-TV in Dallas)

Technical information

Subchannels
The station's digital signal is multiplexed:

Translator

Analog-to-digital conversion
WOI-TV shut down its analog signal, over VHF channel 5, on June 12, 2009, the official date in which full-power television stations in the United States transitioned from analog to digital broadcasts under federal mandate. The station's digital signal relocated from its pre-transition UHF channel 59, which was among the high band UHF channels (52-69) that were removed from broadcasting use as a result of the transition, to its analog-era VHF channel 5.

Also, the "WOI-DT" callsign was legally transferred from the pre-transition digital television channel 59 to the post-transition digital channel 5 and the "WOI-TV" callsign from the now-defunct analog channel 5 was permanently discontinued, rare among stations which usually transferred their analog-era calls to their digital counterparts (although WHO-DT also took the same action).

Transmission aerials

Footnotes

Further reading
 Jeff Stein, Making Waves: The People and Places of Iowa Broadcasting. Cedar Rapids, Iowa: WDG Communications, 2004.
 "'Intrepid Cub Reporter' Living With A 'Colbert Bump.'" All Things Considered, National Public Radio, www.npr.org/, August 20, 2011.

External links
WeAreIowa.com - Official website 
WOI-TV historical artifacts from DesMoinesBroadcasting.com
Coverage map from TVFool.com

ABC network affiliates
True Crime Network affiliates
This TV affiliates
Grit (TV network) affiliates
Cozi TV affiliates
Twist (TV network) affiliates
Television channels and stations established in 1950
Television stations in Des Moines, Iowa
Low-power television stations in the United States
Tegna Inc.
1950 establishments in Iowa